Carl Goldberg Products is a Champaign, Illinois-based manufacturer of radio-controlled airplane kits and Almost Ready to Fly models.

History 
The company was formed by Carl Goldberg (1912-1985) in 1955.

Carl Goldberg Models manufactures radio-controlled (RC) aircraft and components. This company was purchased by Great Planes Model Manufacturing on August 24, 2007.  The model shown on the right was in production during negotiations and is considered to be either the last model produced under the previous owner or the first under the new one; it was released in December 2007.

Models 
The Bucker Jugmann
The Staudacher S-300 GS

Related 
The Academy of Model Aeronautics established the "Carl Goldberg Vital People Award" to recognize contributions to model aviation.

References

External links 
 Biography of Carl Goldberg at AMA History Project
 Overview of Carl Goldberg's life in Model Aviation magazine

Radio-controlled aircraft
Manufacturing companies based in Georgia (U.S. state)
Companies based in Hall County, Georgia
American companies established in 1956
Manufacturing companies established in 1956